The 29th District of the Iowa House of Representatives in the state of Iowa.

Current elected officials
Jon Dunwell is the representative currently representing the district.

Past representatives
The district has previously been represented by:
 Dale M. Cochran, 1971–1973
 B. Joseph Rinas, 1973–1979
 Hurley W. Hall, 1979–1983
 Betty Jean Clark, 1983–1991
 Scott L. Krebsbach, 1991–1993
 Deo A. Koenigs, 1993–1999
 Mark Kuhn, 1999–2003
 Ro Foege, 2003–2009
 Nathan Willems, 2009–2013
 Daniel Kelley, 2013–2017
 Wes Breckenridge, 2017–2021
Jon Dunwell, 2021–present

References

029